United Nations Security Council Resolution 1654, adopted unanimously on January 31, 2006, after recalling previous resolutions concerning the situation in the Democratic Republic of the Congo, including resolutions 1616 (2005) and 1649 (2005), the Council extended the mandate of an expert panel monitoring the arms embargo against the country until July 31, 2006.

Resolution

Observations
Noting that the situation in the Democratic Republic of the Congo continued to constitute a threat to international peace and security, the Council expressed its determination to monitor and enforce the provisions of Resolution 1493 (2003) which imposed the arms embargo, subsequently expanded by Resolution 1596 (2005).

Acts
Acting under Chapter VII of the United Nations Charter, the Council requested the Secretary-General Kofi Annan to re-establish the four-member expert panel monitoring the flow of weapons into and within the Democratic Republic of the Congo until July 31, 2006.

The resolution urged the panel to continue to fulfill its mandate and demanded that all states and parties co-operate with the panel, ensuring its safety and unhindered access.

See also
 Kivu conflict
 Ituri conflict
 List of United Nations Security Council Resolutions 1601 to 1700 (2005–2006)
 Second Congo War

References

External links
 
Text of the Resolution at undocs.org

 1654
2006 in the Democratic Republic of the Congo
 1654
January 2006 events